Loyno is the name of several rural localities in Russia:
Loyno, Kirov Oblast, a selo in Loynsky Rural Okrug of Verkhnekamsky District of Kirov Oblast, 
Loyno, Pskov Oblast, a village in Sebezhsky District of Pskov Oblast,

References